Uzan may refer to:

traveling musicians in Western Asia, see Ashik
Uzan, Pyrénées-Atlantiques, a village in France
Uzan (river), in France
Uzan, Iran, a village in East Azerbaijan Province, Iran
Uzan-e Olya, a village in West Azerbaijan Province, Iran
Uzan-e Sofla, a village in West Azerbaijan Province, Iran
The Dutch abbreviation of the Union of South American Nations (UNASUR)
Cem Uzan, a Turkish businessman and politician
A Tunisian Jewish surname:
Aharon Uzan, an Israeli politician
Ori Uzan, an Israeli footballer
Yaakov Uzan, an Israeli musician better known as Kobi Oz